KDLY (97.5 FM, "97.5 The Brand") is a radio station broadcasting a country music format. Licensed to Lander, Wyoming, United States, the station serves the Riverton area and the Wind River Reservation as well as most of Central Wyoming.  The station is currently owned by Fremont Broadcasting, Inc.

On October 27, 2022 KDLY changed their format from classic hits to country, branded as "97.5 The Brand".

Previous logo

References

External links

Country radio stations in the United States
DLY
Radio stations established in 1978
1978 establishments in the United States